Enrico Bettera (born 13 July 1971) is an Italian racing driver currently competing in the TCR International Series and Italian Touring Car Championship. Having previously competed in the Eurocup Mégane Trophy, Touring Car Endurance Series and Renault Clio Cup Italia amongst others.

Racing career
Bettera began his career in 2009 in the Italian SEAT León Supercópa. In 2010 he switched to the Italian Ferrari Challenge. For 2011 he switched to the Eurocup Mégane Trophy, he finished his first season in the championship sixth in the AM Trophy. He continued in the series for 2012 and 2013, finishing fourth in the AM Trophy in 2013. In 2013 he also raced in the Coppa Italia series and won the Division 1 title that year, he continued in the series for two more seasons and won the Division 1 title both years. In 2014 he made the switch to the Italian Renault Clio Cup, racing there for several seasons in the championship. Before making the switch to the Italian Touring Car Championship in 2016, he finished his partial season fifth in the standings after four podiums and one victory. He continued in the series again in 2017, this time for a full season.

In June 2017 it was announced that he would race in the TCR International Series, driving an Audi RS 3 LMS TCR for Pit Lane Competizioni.

Racing record

Complete TCR International Series results
(key) (Races in bold indicate pole position) (Races in italics indicate fastest lap)

† Driver did not finish the race, but was classified as he completed over 90% of the race distance.
* Season still in progress.

References

External links
 

1971 births
Living people
TCR International Series drivers
Italian racing drivers
24H Series drivers
FIA Motorsport Games drivers
TCR Europe Touring Car Series drivers
Lamborghini Super Trofeo drivers